Ricardo "Rick" Rodriguez is an American professional baseball coach and former professional baseball pitcher. He was the bullpen coach for the Oakland Athletics until he was replaced by Darren Bush, former manager of the Sacramento River Cats on October 26, 2012. On November 23, 2015 he was named as the Pitching Coach for the Nashville Sounds.

Playing career
Rodriguez was drafted by the Athletics in the 2nd round of the 1981 Major League Baseball draft out of the University of California, Riverside, where he had played college baseball for the Highlanders. Previous to Riverside, he went to Castro Valley High School and Chabot College. He spent the next five seasons working his way up through their farm system, reaching the majors for the first time in 1986.

In January , Rodriguez was signed by the Cleveland Indians, pitching one season in their organization with a brief stint in the majors. He became a free agent after the season, then spent a year in the Chicago White Sox organization before spending his final season with the San Francisco Giants in 1990.

Coaching career
In , Rodriguez returned to the Oakland Athletics organization as a minor league pitching coach. He filled that position with the Modesto A's in 1999, then in  he was promoted to the Triple-A Sacramento River Cats.

For the  season, Rodriguez will serve as the bullpen coach for the Oakland Athletics.  Rodriguez was also the bullpen coach for the  season.  On October 26, 2012, he was replaced by Darren Bush.

References

External links

1960 births
Living people
Albany-Colonie A's players
American expatriate baseball players in Canada
Baseball coaches from California
Baseball players from California
Cleveland Indians players
Colorado Springs Sky Sox players
Huntsville Stars players
Major League Baseball pitchers
Minor league baseball managers
Modesto A's players
Oakland Athletics players
Phoenix Firebirds players
San Francisco Giants players
Tacoma Tigers players
UC Riverside Highlanders baseball players
Vancouver Canadians players